Karłowicz is a gender-neutral Polish surname that may refer to

Georgij Karlowicz Kreyer (1887-1942), Russian botanist and mycologist
Mieczysław Karłowicz (1876–1909), Polish composer and conductor
Mieczysław Karłowicz (cyclist) (born 1963), Polish cyclist

Polish-language surnames
Patronymic surnames
Surnames from given names